Events during the year 2007 in Northern Ireland.

Incumbents
 First Minister - Ian Paisley (from 8 May)
 deputy First Minister - Martin McGuinness (from 8 May)
 Secretary of State - Peter Hain (until 28 June), Shaun Woodward (from 28 June)

Events
 22 January – Report by the Police Ombudsman for Northern Ireland states that the Special Branch of the then Royal Ulster Constabulary had colluded with loyalist paramilitaries in a number of murders and attempted murders in Northern Belfast between 1989 and 2002.
 28 January – Special Sinn Féin Ard Fheis approves a motion calling for devolution of policing and justice to the Northern Ireland Assembly and support for the police services.
 30 January, the Prime Minister confirms that assembly elections will go ahead as planned on 7 March. The 'transitional assembly' is thus dissolved, after which campaigning for the elections begins.
 7 March – Elections took place for the suspended Northern Ireland Assembly.
 April – A 100-metre stainless steel 'spire of hope' is installed on St Anne's Cathedral, Belfast.
 8 May – Power devolved; Northern Ireland Assembly meets; Ian Paisley becomes the second First Minister of Northern Ireland, with Martin McGuinness as Deputy First Minister.
 8–10 June – First Garden Show Ireland staged, at Hillsborough Castle, launched by Dermot O'Neill.
 26 June – Former Royal Canadian Mounted Police Assistant Commissioner Al Hutchinson is announced as the successor to Nuala O'Loan as Police Ombudsman for Northern Ireland.
 28 June – Shaun Woodward MP appointed Secretary of State for Northern Ireland.
 June – Barbary lion cub is born at Belfast Zoo, the first Barbary lion to be born in Ireland.
 17 July – Meeting of the North/South Ministerial Council including the Democratic Unionist Party (DUP) for the first time.
 31 July – End of Operation Banner, the British Army deployment in Northern Ireland.
 30 October – Ryanair starts services from George Best Belfast City Airport.
 October – Peter Robinson, Minister of Finance, introduces the first draft budget for consultation.
 5 November – Al Hutchinson takes up the post of Police Ombudsman for Northern Ireland.
 13 December – IKEA open their first store in Ireland at the Holywood Exchange, Belfast.
 December – Aer Lingus launch flights from their first base outside the Republic of Ireland at Belfast International Airport.
 29 December – Nuala O'Loan, former Police Ombudsman for Northern Ireland, is appointed Dame Commander of the Order of the British Empire in the New Year Honours 2008.

Arts and literature

8 February - Writer, broadcaster and journalist, Benedict Kiely, dies.
16 February - Maria Eagle, direct rule Arts Minister, announces a "one-off payment" of £150,000 to sustain the Belfast Festival at Queen's for one more year.
19 October - The 45th Belfast Festival at Queen's opens with a smaller than usual programme due to lack of funding.
18 December - Arts Minister, Edwin Poots, announces a grant of £300,000 over three years for Belfast Festival at Queen's.
Malachi O'Doherty's memoir The Telling Year: Belfast 1972 is publishedl.

Sport

Athletics
6 January - 30th Belfast International Cross Country Event, Stormont Estate, Belfast.
1 February - Armagh International 5k Road Race, The Mall, Armagh.
3 February - Northern Ireland and Ulster Cross Country Championships, University of Ulster, Coleraine. Individual winners: Kelly Reid and Brian Campbell.
17 February-18 February - Irish Indoor Athletics Championships, Odyssey Arena, Belfast.

Cricket
2007 Cricket World Cup: In a successful world cup debut, the Ireland cricket team qualified from the group stage for the Super 8 stage, notably defeating Pakistan cricket team in the process.

Football
European Championship Qualifiers
24 March - Liechtenstein 1 - 4 Northern Ireland
28 March - Northern Ireland 2 - 1 Sweden
22 August - Northern Ireland 3 - 1 Liechtenstein
8 September - Latvia 1 - 0 Northern Ireland
12 September - Iceland 2 - 1 Northern Ireland
17 October - Sweden 1 - 1 Northern Ireland
17 November - Northern Ireland 2 - 1 Denmark
21 November - Spain 1 - 0 Northern Ireland
Northern Ireland came third in the group and failed to qualify.

Other International Matches
Northern Ireland 0 - 0 Wales (6 February)
Setanta Cup
Winners: Drogheda United
Irish League
Winners: Linfield
Irish Cup
Winners: Linfield

Gaelic Athletic Association
 15 July - Tyrone defeat Monaghan 1-15 to 1-13 in the final of the Ulster Senior Football Championship.

Golf
8 September - 9 September - Walker Cup takes place at Royal County Down Golf Club, Newcastle, County Down.
Pádraig Harrington wins the British Open in Carnoustie, Scotland. Rory McIlroy wins the silver medal for leading amateur. Darren Clarke misses the cut.

Motorcycling
12 May - North West 200
17 August - Ulster Grand Prix, Dundrod.

Rugby Union

 RBS Six Nations Championship
4 February - Wales 9 - 19 Ireland
11 February - Ireland 17 - 20 France
24 February - Ireland 43 - 13 England
10 March - Scotland 18 - 19 Ireland
17 March - Italy 24 - 51 Ireland
Ireland finished in second position in the Championship after France.

 2007 Rugby World Cup
Ireland 32 - 17 Namibia
Ireland 14 - 10 Georgia
Ireland 3 - 25 France
Ireland 15 - 30 Argentina

Deaths
3 January - Sir Cecil Walker, Ulster Unionist Member of Parliament for North Belfast (1983–2001), heart attack. (born 1924) 
8 January - David Ervine, leader of the Progressive Unionist Party, heart attack leading to stroke and brain haemorrhage. (born 1953).
8 February - Benedict Kiely, writer, broadcaster and journalist (born 1919).
16 February - Norman Miscampbell, British Conservative Party MP (born 1925).
22 February - Miriam Mone, fashion designer (born 1965).
2 April - Emma Groves, blinded by a rubber bullet in 1971, became a leading campaigner for banning the use of plastic bullets, co-founder of the United Campaign Against Plastic Bullets (born 1920).
12 June - Eamonn Coleman, Gaelic footballer and manager (born 1948).
24 June - Derek Dougan, footballer (born 1938).
1 August - Tommy Makem, folk musician, artist, poet and storyteller (born 1932).
6 September - John Kelly, Sinn Féin Councillor and MLA (born 1936).
30 September - Len Graham, footballer (born 1925).
17 October - Sammy Duddy, member of the Ulster Political Research Group (born 1945).
3 November - Martin Meehan, Sinn Féin politician and former volunteer in the Provisional Irish Republican Army (born 1945).
13 November - Alec Cooke, Baron Cooke of Islandreagh, businessman and politician (born 1920).
31 December - Tommy Dickson, footballer (born 1929).

See also
2007 in England
2007 in Scotland
2007 in Wales

References